Amber Torrealba (born July 1, 1990) is a 3X World Champion Skimboarder and Filmmaker.

Amber was born and raised on the east coast in Melbourne, Florida and currently resides in Laguna Beach, California.  She has been skimboarding since 17 years of age and has been competing in the women's professional skimboarding division since 2014. Amber is also actively involved in videography and the production of content in many other action sports. She has created videos with companies such as Red Bull and Adobe. In 2015 she was ranked 6th in the world on the United Skim Tour and also featured as Leading Lady in the Pulse Skimboarding Magazine. After migrating to Southern California, Torrealba has ranked in several professional competitions including 2nd Place at the Skim USA OBX Skim Jam, 1st Place at the Santa Cruz SkimBlast and went on to clinch the Vic Women's World Championship of Skimboarding in 2016, 2018, and 2019.

Torrealba is represented professionally by Athelo Group, a sports agency based out of Stamford, Connecticut.

Film 

Torrealba's short film "No One" starring herself and Chabe White, will be premiering in 2022.

Amber has directed, edited, and produced content for brands such as Red Bull, Motorola, Sea Doo, Michelob ULTRA, Vayner Media, and is an ambassador for Adobe as the face of their new all device editing program, Premiere Rush.

Sponsors 

As of 2022, Torrealba is sponsored by: 
Victoria Skimboards, Body Glove, Etnies, Blenders Eyewear, Freestyle Watches, Let's Party Traction, Skydio, and Hemp Fusion.

Appearances 

Torrealba has made appearances in many print and billboards across her career such as for Adobe, Sea Doo, Blenders Eyewear.

Early life 

Amber was skateboarder and varsity athlete pursuing college basketball. She started her own skateboarding brand out of high school, sponsoring riders such as Tyson Peterson before he went pro. From there she also worked in the corporate world after college, before leaving her day job to focus on skimboarding and filmmaking.

Contests

Gallery

References

External links
 

1990 births
Living people
People from Melbourne, Florida
Sportspeople from Florida
Skimboarding